"You're So Vain" is a song written in 1971 by American singer and songwriter Carly Simon and released in November 1972. It is one of the songs with which Simon is most identified, and upon its release, reached No. 1 in the United States, Canada, Australia, and New Zealand.  The song is ranked at No. 92 on Billboard's Greatest Songs of All Time. "You're So Vain" was voted No. 216 in RIAA's Songs of the Century, and in August 2014, the UK's Official Charts Company crowned it the ultimate song of the 1970s. In 2021, the song was ranked 495th on Rolling Stone's 500 Greatest Songs of All Time. The song was nominated for Song of the Year, Record of the Year, and  Best Female Pop Vocal Performance at the 16th Annual Grammy Awards.

The song is a critical profile of a self-absorbed lover about whom Simon asserts, "You're so vain, you probably think this song is about you." The title subject's identity has long been a matter of speculation, with Simon stating that the song refers to three men, only one of whom she has named publicly: Warren Beatty. 

The distinctive bass guitar intro is played by Klaus Voormann. The strings were arranged by Simon and orchestrated by Paul Buckmaster, and Simon plays piano on the track.

Origin and subject of the song
Long before Simon recorded what would be known as "You're So Vain", the song was titled "Bless You, Ben".  The first words were, "Bless you, Ben.  You came in when nobody else left off." Simon felt dissatisfied with the lyrics and put the song away until she attended a party one night where a famous guest appeared. A friend told Simon the male guest entered as if he was "walking onto a yacht".  Simon incorporated the words into the melody of "Bless You, Ben" as she was composing on her piano, and the song took on a whole new meaning.

Before the song became a hit single in 1972, Simon told an interviewer that the song was about "men", not a specific "man".

In 1983, she said the song was not about Mick Jagger, who contributed uncredited backing vocals to it. In a 1993 book, Angie Bowie claimed to be the "wife of a close friend" mentioned in "You're So Vain", and that Jagger, for a time, had been "obsessed" with her. Simon made another comment about the subject's identity as a guest artist on Janet Jackson's 2001 single, "Son of a Gun (I Betcha Think This Song Is About You)", which sampled "You're So Vain". Simon said about the song, "The apricot scarf was worn by Nick [Delbanco]. Nothing in the words referred to Mick [Jagger]."

Shortly before the writing of the song, Simon was married to James Taylor; she has said that he was "definitely not" the subject of the song. David Bowie, David Cassidy and Cat Stevens have all been cited by the press as speculative candidates.

In August 2003, Simon agreed to reveal the name of the song's subject to the highest bidder of the Martha's Vineyard Possible Dreams charity auction. With the top bid of $50,000, Dick Ebersol, president of NBC Sports and a friend of Simon, won the right to know the name of the subject of "You're So Vain". A condition of the prize was that Ebersol not reveal the name. Ebersol said Simon allowed him to divulge a clue about the person's name: "Carly told me that I could offer up to the entire world a clue as to what she'll tell me when we have this night in about two weeks. And the clue is: The letter 'E' is in the person's name."

Over the years Simon has divulged "letter clues". In 2004, Simon told Regis Philbin, "If I tell it, it's going to come out in dribs and drabs. And I've given out two letters already, an 'A' and an 'E'. But I'm going to add one to it. I'm going to add an 'R' in honor of you."

In 2005, Simon's ex-husband Jim Hart said he was sure that the song was not about anyone famous.

In a 2007 interview, Warren Beatty said, "Let's be honest. That song was about me." Simon had said in 1983 that Beatty "certainly thought it was about him—he called me and said thanks for the song..." In an interview for the 1978/1982 version of The History of Rock and Roll radio series, producer Richard Perry said that Simon was essentially referring to Beatty while also evoking other previous relationships in her life.

Howard Stern stated that Simon had privately revealed to him about whom the song was written after her 2014 interview on his popular radio show on Sirius Satellite Radio. Stern commented, "There is an odd aspect to it... he's not that vain." He also stated that she had said it was a "composite of three people." Simon confirmed that she has given the names to a few people, including Stern.

In her 2008 book Girls Like Us, author Sheila Weller includes a detailed account of Simon's love affair with musician Dan Armstrong, and suggests that he was the inspiration for "You're So Vain". Her heartbreak over eventually losing him inspired the song "Dan, My Fling", which appears on her first album. Armstrong's full name, Daniel Kent Armstrong, contains all three letters of Simon's clue.

In a November 4, 2009, interview on WNYC, Simon said she had hidden the name of the subject in a then-new recording of the song. The next day, the program's crew detected the name "David" concealed in a back-played whisper. However, Simon contradicted this, saying she had spoken "Ovid" both forwards and backwards, and that sounded like David. In February 2010, Simon reiterated that the name of the subject was whispered in a re-recording of "You're So Vain": "There's a little whisper—and it's the answer to the puzzle." A representative for Simon stated that the name whispered during the song is "David". Multiple media outlets then speculated that the subject was Elektra Records executive, David Geffen, which Jim Hart, Simon's ex-husband and close friend, denied the following day. Simon said that when she wrote the song in 1971, she had not yet met Geffen. Simon's publicist also confirmed the song was not about Geffen, but that there was indeed "a David who is connected to the song in some way, shape, or form". Vanity Fair noted that in addition to "David", "Warren" and an unintelligible name are whispered during the recording.

After her live performance of the song with Simon in July 2013, Taylor Swift stated that Simon had revealed the identity of the song's subject to her in confidence.

In November 2015, Simon, promoting her about-to-be-published memoirs, said, "I have confirmed that the second verse is Warren (Beatty)" and added that "Warren thinks the whole thing is about him".  Simon added to the mystery by including “Now, that doesn't mean that the other two verses aren't also about Warren,” she told the BBC. “It just means that the second one is.”  The song originally had a fourth verse, possibly including another subject.<ref name="fourth">{{Cite web |url=https://www.bbc.com/news/entertainment-arts-39809556 |title=Carly Simon Plays 'You're So Vains Lost Verse |publisher=BBC News |language=en-GB |date=May 5, 2017 |access-date=October 22, 2020}}</ref>

Chart performance
The song was a No.1 hit in the US, Canada, Australia, and New Zealand, and reached No.4 in Ireland and South Africa. Entering at No.99 on the Billboard Hot 100 on 2 December 1972, the song took five more weeks to rise to the top of the chart, where it stayed for the first three weeks of 1973. It was replaced by Stevie Wonder's "Superstition" and spent the next month in the runner-up spot. It also spent two weeks at the top of the Easy Listening chart in early 1973, her first No.1 on either chart. "You're So Vain" was Simon's breakthrough hit in the United Kingdom, reaching No.3 on the UK chart on its original release in 1973. The song was re-released in the UK in 1991 to cash in on its inclusion in a commercial for Dunlop Tyres, peaking at No.41.

Personnel
From the No Secrets album liner notes:

Carly Simon: Lead vocals, acoustic piano, string arrangement
Jimmy Ryan: Guitar
Klaus Voormann: Bass
Jim Gordon: Drums
Richard Perry: Percussion
Paul Buckmaster: Orchestration

Mick Jagger contributed uncredited backing vocals for the song.  When asked how this collaboration occurred, Simon said:

He happened to call at the studio. … I said "We're doing some backup vocals on a song of mine, why don't you come down and sing with us?"

References in the song
 Gavotte—used in the line "You had one eye in the mirror as you watched yourself gavotte"—is a French dance. In this context it can be taken to mean moving in a pretentious manner.
 Simon said the line "clouds in my coffee" came "from an airplane flight that I took with Billy Mernit, who was my friend and piano player at the time. As I got my coffee, there were clouds outside the window of the airplane and you could see the reflection in the cup of coffee. Billy said to me, 'Look at the clouds in your coffee'."
 The line "I hear you went up to Saratoga and your horse naturally won" refers to the Saratoga Race Course horse-racing season held in late July, August, and early September in Saratoga Springs, New York. The season is frequented by the rich and famous of New York and other East Coast cities.
 The line "Then you flew your Learjet up to Nova Scotia to see the total eclipse of the sun" refers to the total solar eclipse of July 10, 1972, visible only in Nova Scotia as well as Alaska and the Canadian Arctic. (A different solar eclipse crossed Nova Scotia on March 7, 1970, but this eclipse was also visible along the east coast of the United States, and thus it was unnecessary to fly to Nova Scotia to see it, and it was well outside the Saratoga racing season mentioned in the previous line.)

In popular culture

 In the Season 5 episode "When It Rains, It Pours" of the American TV series 30 Rock, Jack Donaghy, in a video message to his son, states that he wrote the song.
 In the movie How to Lose A Guy In 10 Days, Andie (Kate Hudson), sings it to Ben (Matthew McConaughey) when she is at his house, and again when she finds out about the bet he made with his boss.
 In the Season 11 episode "Total Recall" of the American TV cartoon Family Guy, a cutaway gag featuring Carly Simon indicates jokingly that the song was written about Don Knotts, though in real life there was never a romantic relationship between the two.
 The song was referenced in the Depp v. Heard trial in regard to an incident between the couple in Australia, where writing in lipstick was found on a bathroom mirror, reading, "Call Carly Simon. She said it better, babe." Camille Vasquez, attorney for Johnny Depp, also referenced the song when cross-examining Amber Heard.
 In late 2022, the song gained popularity from the app TikTok after an edit was made from How to Lose a Guy in 10 Days|How to Lose A Guy In 10 Days''.

Track listing
7" single
 "You're So Vain" – 4:25
 "His Friends Are More Than Fond Of Robin" – 3:00

Charts

Weekly charts

Year-end charts

All-time charts

Certifications and sales

Awards

See also
 List of Billboard Hot 100 number-one singles of 1973
 List of number-one adult contemporary singles of 1973 (U.S.)
 List of number-one singles in Australia during the 1970s
 List of RPM number-one singles of 1973
"You Oughta Know", a song with another mystery subject

References

1972 singles
1973 singles
Carly Simon songs
Elektra Records singles
Billboard Hot 100 number-one singles
Cashbox number-one singles
Number-one singles in Australia
Number-one singles in New Zealand
Oricon International Singles Chart number-one singles
RPM Top Singles number-one singles
Song recordings produced by Richard Perry
Songs written by Carly Simon
Songs about actors
Works about narcissism
Diss tracks
Mick Jagger songs
Marilyn Manson (band) songs
Songs about infidelity